Anthony Michael Volpe (born April 28, 2001) is an American professional baseball shortstop in the New York Yankees organization.

Amateur career
Volpe attended Delbarton School in Morristown, New Jersey, where he played for the school's baseball team and was a teammate of Jack Leiter. As a senior, he batted .488 with seven home runs, 34 runs batted in (RBIs), and 17 stolen bases. He was named the 2019 New Jersey High School Player of the Year by Perfect Game. Volpe committed to play college baseball at Vanderbilt University.

Professional career
The New York Yankees selected Volpe in the first round, with the 30th overall selection, of the 2019 Major League Baseball draft. He signed on June 10, receiving a $2.7 million signing bonus, and made his professional debut with the Pulaski Yankees of the Rookie Advanced Appalachian League. Over 34 games, he batted .215 with two home runs and 11 RBIs. During the COVID-19 shutdown, which resulted in the cancellation of the 2020 minor league season, Volpe worked to gain muscle and improve his swing. To begin the 2021 season, he was assigned to the Tampa Tarpons of the Low-A Southeast. After slashing .302/.455/.623 with 12 home runs and 49 RBIs in 54 games played, the Yankees promoted him to the Hudson Valley Renegades of High-A East.

The Yankees assigned Volpe to the Somerset Patriots of the Double-A Eastern League for the start of the 2022 season. On June 26, Volpe hit a walk-off home run in the bottom of the 10th inning to a 6-5 win against the visiting Hartford Yard Goats. His solo homer delivered the Eastern League Northeast Division first-half title to the Somerset Patriots in a winner-take-all game between the division's top two teams. In July, Volpe represented the American League at the All-Star Futures Game. Volpe batted .252 with 18 home runs and 60 RBIs in 109 games for Somerset and was promoted to the Scranton/Wilkes-Barre RailRiders of the Triple-A International League on September 2.

In 2023, the Yankees invited Volpe to spring training as a non-roster player.

References

External links

2000 births
Living people
Baseball shortstops
Pulaski Yankees players
American people of Italian descent
Baseball players from New Jersey
Tampa Tarpons players
Hudson Valley Renegades players
Somerset Patriots players
Scranton/Wilkes-Barre RailRiders players